Brett Fairchild is an American politician serving as a member of the Kansas House of Representatives from the 113th district. Elected in November 2020, he assumed office on January 11, 2021.

Background 
Fairchild was born in Stafford, Kansas. He earned a Bachelor of Business Administration from Sterling College. Prior to entering politics, Fairchild worked as a substitute teacher and farmer. Fairchild was elected to the Kansas House of Representatives in November 2020 and assumed office on January 11, 2021, succeeding Alicia Straub.

References 

Living people
People from Stafford, Kansas
Sterling College alumni
Republican Party members of the Kansas House of Representatives
Year of birth missing (living people)
21st-century American politicians